Kociołki may refer to the following places:
Kociołki, Piotrków County in Łódź Voivodeship (central Poland)
Kociołki, Sieradz County in Łódź Voivodeship (central Poland)
Kociołki, Podlaskie Voivodeship (north-east Poland)
Kociołki, Masovian Voivodeship (east-central Poland)
Kociołki, Warmian-Masurian Voivodeship (north Poland)